Kabalebo River is a river in Suriname. It joins with the Courantyne River near Apoera. A plan for a dam in the river serving a hydroelectric power plant is part of the West Suriname Plan of the 1960s. As of 2020, no construction has taken place. Petrogylphs had been discovered on a rock by Ten Kate in 1886.

See also
List of rivers of Suriname

Notes

References
Rand McNally, The New International Atlas, 1993.

Rivers of Suriname